The 2009 Masters Tournament was the 73rd Masters Tournament, held April 9–12 at Augusta National Golf Club in Augusta, Georgia. Ángel Cabrera, age 39, won his second major title in playoff over Chad Campbell and Kenny Perry. Cabrera became the first (and only) Masters champion from Argentina and South America.

This was the final Masters appearance for three-time champion Gary Player, and one-time champions Raymond Floyd and Fuzzy Zoeller.

Course

Field
The Masters has the smallest field of the major championships, and officially remains an invitation event, but there is now a qualification process. In theory, the club could simply decline to invite a qualified player. This is the list of all 96 players who qualified to play in the 2009 Masters Tournament.

1. Past Masters Champions
Fred Couples, Ben Crenshaw, Raymond Floyd, Trevor Immelman (10,14,16,17,18), Zach Johnson (15,17,18), Bernhard Langer, Sandy Lyle, Phil Mickelson (4,5,10,14,15,16,17,18), Larry Mize, José María Olazábal, Mark O'Meara, Gary Player, Vijay Singh (4,10,14,15,16,17,18), Craig Stadler, Tom Watson, Mike Weir (14,16,17,18), Tiger Woods (2,3,4,10,11,14,15,17,18), Ian Woosnam, Fuzzy Zoeller

(Past champions who did not play: Tommy Aaron, Seve Ballesteros, Jack Burke Jr., Billy Casper, Charles Coody, Nick Faldo, Doug Ford, Bob Goalby, Jack Nicklaus, and Arnold Palmer.)

2. Last five U.S. Open Champions
Ángel Cabrera (17), Michael Campbell, Retief Goosen (15,17,18), Geoff Ogilvy (14,15,17,18)

3. Last five British Open Champions
Todd Hamilton, Pádraig Harrington (4,10,12,13,14,17,18)

4. Last five PGA Champions

5. Last two of The Players Champions
Sergio García (13,14,16,17,18)

6. Top two finishers in the 2008 U.S. Amateur
Drew Kittleson (a), Danny Lee (a)

7. Winner of the 2008 Amateur Championship
Reinier Saxton (a)

8. Winner of the 2008 U.S. Amateur Public Links
Jack Newman (a)

9. Winner of the 2008 U.S. Mid-Amateur
Steve Wilson (a)

10. The top 16 finishers and ties in the 2008 Masters Tournament
Stuart Appleby (14,16,17), Paul Casey (15,17,18), Stewart Cink (14,15,16,17,18), Steve Flesch, Miguel Ángel Jiménez (11,17,18), Robert Karlsson (11,17,18), Sean O'Hair (18), Andrés Romero (16,17,18), Brandt Snedeker, Nick Watney (15,18), Lee Westwood (11,17,18)

11. Top 8 finishers and ties in the 2008 U.S. Open
Rocco Mediate, John Merrick, Carl Pettersson (14,15,16), D. J. Trahan (14,16)

12. Top 4 finishers and ties in the 2008 British Open Championship
Greg Norman, Ian Poulter (17,18), Henrik Stenson (13,17,18)

13. Top 4 finishers and ties in the 2008 PGA Championship
Ben Curtis (14,16,17,18), Camilo Villegas (14,15,16,17,18)

14. Top 30 leaders on the 2008 PGA Tour
Robert Allenby (16,17,18), Stephen Ames (17,18), Chad Campbell (16), K. J. Choi (16,17,18), Ken Duke (16), Ernie Els (16,17,18), Jim Furyk (16,17,18), Dudley Hart (16), Ryuji Imada (15,16), Anthony Kim (15,16,17,18), Justin Leonard (15,16,17,18), Hunter Mahan (16,17), Kenny Perry (15,16,17,18), Steve Stricker (16,17,18), Kevin Sutherland (16), Boo Weekley (15,17)

15. Winners of PGA Tour events that award a full-point allocation for the season-ending Tour Championship, between the 2008 Masters Tournament and the 2009 Masters Tournament
Dustin Johnson (18), Pat Perez (18), Chez Reavie, Adam Scott (17,18), Y. E. Yang

16. All players qualifying for the 2008 edition of The Tour Championship
Briny Baird, Tim Clark (17,18), Billy Mayfair, Bubba Watson

17. Top 50 on the final 2008 Official World Golf Rankings list
Aaron Baddeley, Luke Donald (18), Ross Fisher (18), Søren Hansen, Shingo Katayama (18), Martin Kaymer (18), Søren Kjeldsen (18), Graeme McDowell (18), Rory McIlroy (18), Justin Rose (18), Rory Sabbatini (18), Jeev Milkha Singh (18), Richard Sterne, Lin Wen-tang, Oliver Wilson (18)

18. Top 50 on the Official World Golf Rankings list going into the tournament
Mathew Goggin, Prayad Marksaeng, Louis Oosthuizen, Álvaro Quirós

19. International invitees
Ryo Ishikawa

Raymond Floyd, Greg Norman, Gary Player, and Fuzzy Zoeller were playing their final Masters event. Ryo Ishikawa, aged 17, became the youngest professional ever to appear in the Masters.

Par 3 contest
The annual par 3 contest was held on Wednesday, April 8. Tim Clark won with a score of -5 (22), two shots better than José María Olazábal and Jack Newman. Three players shot a hole-in-one: John Merrick on the second hole, Greg Norman on the sixth, and Clark on the ninth.

Round summaries
The Masters Tournament is played over four days with an 18-hole round being played each day, for a total of 72 holes plus practice rounds and a par-three contest on the neighboring par-three course.  Everyone outside the top 44 and ties or outside ten strokes of the leader was "cut" after two rounds.

First round 
Thursday, April 9, 2009

The first round weather conditions were sunny and calm. Chad Campbell, scored a 7 under par 65, which included five straight birdies in the first five holes. Campbell finished the day with a one stroke lead over Jim Furyk and Hunter Mahan. Larry Mize shot a five under par 67 to be two strokes behind. Mahan led the field in total birdies with 9 in the first round.

Second round
Friday, April 10, 2009

Campbell continued his strong play with a 2 under par 70 to remain in the lead at 135 (−9) with Kenny Perry, who shot a bogey-free 67. Raymond Floyd, 1976 champion, Fuzzy Zoeller, 1979 champion, and three-time winner Gary Player completed their final rounds at Augusta. Anthony Kim shot the day's low round with a 65, which included a new record for most birdies in a round with eleven.

The cut, the top 44 players and ties, was at 145 (+1), and fifty players advanced to the weekend. In all, 25 players shot sub-par rounds for the day and the scoring average was 73.74. For the tournament, 32 players were under par, and the scoring average was 72.99.

Amateurs: Saxton (+3), Newman (+4), Kittleson (+6), Wilson (+10), Lee (+11).

Third round
Saturday, April 11, 2009

Third round conditions were sunny, but with gusty winds that made scoring a bit tougher than the previous two days.  Perry shot a two-under par 70 to remain in the lead at 205 (-11), with Ángel Cabrera who shot a 69. Campbell led for most of the day until a double bogey on the 16th hole and carded 72, two strokes back at 207. Jim Furyk finished another stroke back of Campbell. Five players shot the day's low round of 4 under par 68. Those players were: Jim Furyk -8, Steve Stricker -7, Sean O'Hair -4, Ian Poulter -4, and Steve Flesch -3.

Final round
Sunday, April 12, 2009

Summary
Phil Mickelson birdied six holes on the front nine to score 30, tying the front-nine tournament record held by Johnny Miller, Greg Norman, and K. J. Choi. Third round co-leader Perry, age 48, led for most of the day; after birdies at 15 and 16, he disappointingly finished with bogeys at 17 and 18. He fell into a three-way tie at 276 (−12) with Cabrera and Campbell, leading to a sudden-death playoff.

Final leaderboard

Scorecard

Cumulative tournament scores, relative to par
{|class="wikitable" span = 50 style="font-size:85%;
|-
|style="background: Red;" width=10|
|Eagle
|style="background: Pink;" width=10|
|Birdie
|style="background: PaleGreen;" width=10|
|Bogey
|style="background: Green;" width=10|
|Double bogey
|}
Source:

Playoff
The playoff began on the 18th hole and Campbell was eliminated after failing to get up and down from the right greenside bunker. Perry was just off the green to the right, chipped close, and tapped in for par. Cabrera scrambled after an errant tee shot and a recovery shot that ricocheted off a tree, fortuitously into the fairway.

Controversies
Rory McIlroy was involved in a controversial incident during the second round. In sixth place on the leaderboard with three holes left to play, McIlroy had double-bogeyed the 16th hole before hitting his approach shot into a bunker on the 18th hole. He failed with his first attempt to get the ball out of the bunker and kicked out at the sand, which could be an offense if it was deemed to be testing the condition of the hazard. He finished his round at 4:15 p.m. local time and at 8:40 p.m. was called to the clubhouse to view footage of the incident. He was later cleared of any wrongdoing, as a player is allowed to smooth over the sand provided that it does nothing to improve the position of the ball with regard to the next shot.

Also during the second round, while putting for birdie on the 15th green, Pádraig Harrington had stepped up to his ball and addressed it, but a gust of wind caused him to step away. The ball then moved, but since he had grounded his club previously, he was deemed to have caused it to move and was penalized one stroke. He sunk the putt and, with the penalty stroke added, scored a par 5 on the hole.

Notes

References

External links

Masters.com – past winners and results
Coverage on the European Tour's official site
Augusta.com – 2009 Masters leaderboard and scorecards

2009
2009 in golf
2009 in American sports
2009 in sports in Georgia (U.S. state)
April 2009 sports events in the United States